Suzanne P. Clark is an American business executive. She is currently the president and CEO of the U.S. Chamber of Commerce, the first woman to hold that office. She was previously the chief operating officer and senior executive vice president for the group. Prior to this she was president of National Journal Group (now Atlantic Media), and founded the Potomac Research Group.

Clark sits on the corporate boards of TransUnion and AGCO, and the board of the Economic Club of Washington.

Education 
Clark earned her undergraduate and Masters of Business Administration degrees from Georgetown University.

Career 
From 2007 to 2010, Clark was president of the National Journal Group, an arm of the Atlantic Media Company.

In 2012, she acquired the Potomac Research Group before returning to the U.S. Chamber of Commerce in 2014.

Clark was appointed to the boards of AGCO and Transunion in 2017. In 2020, The National Association of Corporate Directors named Clark an honoree of its Directorship 100, an annual list of the leading corporate directors.

Clark serves as a board member of the Economic Club of Washington and the So Others Might Eat foundation. 

Clark is also the former president of the International Women's Forum's Washington chapter.

U.S. Chamber of Commerce 
Clark's career with the U.S. Chamber of Commerce began in 1997, when she took a position as a top aide to CEO Tom J. Donohue. Between 1997 and 2007, Clark held multiple senior positions within the organization, ultimately serving as chief operating officer.

In 2014, Clark was named senior executive vice president of the U.S. Chamber, serving until her 2019. In June 2019, she was appointed as president of the Chamber, becoming the first female president in the institution's 107-year history. In March 2021, Clark succeeded Donohue's 24-year tenure as CEO of the Chamber.

References 

American businesspeople
American women in business
McDonough School of Business alumni
Date of birth missing (living people)
Living people
United States Chamber of Commerce people
21st-century American businesswomen
21st-century American businesspeople
Year of birth missing (living people)